The Queensland Railways 8D15 class locomotive was a class of 2-8-2T steam locomotives operated by the Queensland Railways.

History
In 1884 Dübs & Co delivered five 2-8-2T locomotives to the Queensland Railways. Three were delivered to the Southern & Western Railway and one each to the Central (Rockhampton) and Great Northern (Townsville) Railways. The latter was transferred to the Central Railway without use. Per Queensland Railway's classification system they were designated the 8D15 class, the 8 representing the number of driving wheels, the D that it was a tank locomotive, and the 15 the cylinder diameter in inches.

Two were converted to tender engines in 1890/91. All were later reboilered. The tank engines were written off in October 1922, the tender locomotives in 1938 having spent their finals years hauling limestone and water trains to Mount Morgan gold mine.

Class list

References

Dübs locomotives
Railway locomotives introduced in 1884
8D15
2-8-2T locomotives
3 ft 6 in gauge locomotives of Australia